Loretto is a city in Lawrence County, Tennessee, United States. The population was 1,714 at the 2010 census, and 1,739 at the 2020 census.

History

Loretto began as a stagecoach station known as "Glen Rock" in the early 19th century.  In 1870, a number of German Catholic immigrants settled in the Loretto area, and a new city was established shortly afterward.  Some sources suggest the name "Loretto" was inspired by the Loreto region in Italy, while others say the city was named for a sainted nun. The congregation the immigrants formed, the Sacred Heart Church of Jesus, still exists, and their church (built in 1912) is listed on the National Register of Historic Places. With the arrival of the railroad in the 1880s, Loretto thrived as a lumber town.

Other historic buildings include the Bank of Loretto building, which was built in the 1920s. The Bank of Loretto building was renovated in 2013 and housed Nana's Pizzeria, which closed in late 2020. The building now houses The Noble Fox restaurant. Next door to the old Loretto bank building was Weathers Store and Myers Store. They sold general merchandise to generations of families. Steps down the street lies the Loretto Milling Company, established in 1895 and still open for business, making it one of the oldest family-run businesses in the city.  Other businesses located in this district included a doctor's office, cobbler's shop, cafes, hotels, and a funeral home. There was also a stage coach stop, and then later on a bus depot.  The historic downtown area began to decline following the construction of U.S. Route 43 to the east of the district in the 1940s, when its commercial activity shifted to the new highway.  Like many Southern towns, Loretto is applying for grants to help revive the older historic district.

Loretto is the home of the Loretto High School Mustangs.

Geography
Loretto is located at  (35.078401, -87.439023).  The city is situated on a relatively broad ridgetop between the Shoal Creek Valley to the west and Bluewater Creek to the east.  U.S. Route 43 connects Loretto with Lawrenceburg to the northeast and the Muscle Shoals area in Alabama to the southwest.  Tennessee State Route 227 connects Loretto with rural Lawrence County and Lexington, Alabama, to the southeast (the road becomes Alabama State Route 101 at the state line).

Demographics

2020 census

As of the 2020 United States census, there were 1,739 people, 703 households, and 455 families residing in the city.

2000 census
As of the census of 2000, there were 1,665 people, 681 households, and 486 families residing in the city. The population density was 442.3 people per square mile (171.0/km2). There were 735 housing units at an average density of 195.3 per square mile (75.5/km2). The racial makeup of the city was 98.14% White, 0.60% African American, 0.30% Native American, 0.18% Asian, 0.24% from other races, and 0.54% from two or more races. Hispanic or Latino of any race were 1.02% of the population.

There were 681 households, out of which 29.5% had children under the age of 18 living with them, 58.3% were married couples living together, 10.4% had a female householder with no husband present, and 28.5% were non-families. 24.8% of all households were made up of individuals, and 13.8% had someone living alone who was 65 years of age or older. The average household size was 2.44 and the average family size was 2.91.

In the city, the population was spread out, with 23.5% under the age of 18, 8.8% from 18 to 24, 25.5% from 25 to 44, 24.0% from 45 to 64, and 18.1% who were 65 years of age or older. The median age was 40 years. For every 100 females, there were 89.6 males. For every 100 females age 18 and over, there were 86.3 males.

The median income for a household in the city was $31,528, and the median income for a family was $35,952. Males had a median income of $29,940 versus $21,250 for females. The per capita income for the city was $18,195. About 9.5% of families and 13.6% of the population were below the poverty line, including 16.6% of those under age 18 and 18.7% of those age 65 or over.

Notable people
 Grace & Tony, country music artists
 Robert Hitchcock Spain, Methodist bishop
 David Weathers, Major League Baseball pitcher
 Ryan Weathers, Major League Baseball pitcher, son of David Weathers
 John Paul White, member of The Civil Wars Americana (music) duo

References

External links

Municipal Technical Advisory Service entry for Loretto — information on local government, elections, and link to charter

Cities in Tennessee
Cities in Lawrence County, Tennessee